Mohammad Jahromi (born 1958) is a former Iranian governor and politician who served as minister of labor and social affairs from 2005 to 2009.

Early life and education
Jahromi was born in Tehran in 1958. He holds a bachelor's degree in mathematics. He also received a PhD in strategic management.

Career
Jahromi was the deputy chairman for executive affairs of the Guardian Council. He was also one of the founding members of the IRGC in the provinces of Gilan and Mazandaran in 1979. He acted as an IRGC commander in Noor. In addition, he served as the governor of different provinces, including Zanjan (1982-1984), Lorestan (1984-1989) and Semnan (1984-1999). He was among the members of secretariat of the State Expediency Council.

On 24 August 2005, he became the minister of labor and social affairs in the first cabinet of Mahmoud Ahmedinejad. He was approved by the Majlis with 197 votes in favor. During his tenure, he was considered to be the economic spokesperson of the government. In late 2008, he announced his candidacy for the presidential election of 2009. He was succeeded by Reza Sheykholeslam in August 2009 as minister of labor and social affairs.

Immediately after his removal from office, Jahromi was appointed deputy of the judiciary chief, Sadeq Larijani, in August 2009. Next Jahromi was named chief of the state-run Bank Saderat.

Sanctions
Jahromi was sanctioned by the European Union on 1 December 2011 due to his presidency at the Saderat Bank, which was also sanctioned by the Union. He was omitted from the sanction list in October 2012.

Personal life
Jahromi is the son-in-law of Ali Akbar Nategh Noori.

References

External links

21st-century Iranian politicians
1958 births
Islamic Revolutionary Guard Corps officers
Government ministers of Iran
Governors of Lorestan Province
Governors of Zanjan Province
Living people
People from Jahrom
People from Tehran
Governors of Hamadan Province